Memecylon sessilicarpum is a species of plant in the family Melastomataceae. It is endemic to Mozambique.

References

sessilicarpum
Data deficient plants
Endemic flora of Mozambique
Taxonomy articles created by Polbot
Taxobox binomials not recognized by IUCN